Livadi or Leivadi ( or Λειβάδι, "meadow") may refer to several places in Greece:

Livadi, a town in the Larissa regional unit
Livadi, Cythera, a village on the island of Cythera
Livadi, Pieria, a village in the municipality Pydna-Kolindros
Livadi Serifou, a village on the island of Serifos
Livadi, Thessaloniki, a village in the Thessaloniki regional unit

See also
Livadia (disambiguation)